Aylanlu may refer to:
Davtashen, Aragatsotn, Armenia - formerly Aylanlu
Khoronk, Armenia - formerly Nerkin Aylanlu
Tsaghkunk, Armavir, Armenia - formerly Verin Aylanlu